"First Love" is a song by the Japanese-American singer-songwriter Hikaru Utada. It was released on April 28, 1999, as the third Japanese language single from her second studio album, First Love, which was issued a month previously. It was certified double platinum for 800,000 copies shipped to stores in Japan.

In a 2009 survey by Oricon, asking respondents what song they wanted to hear with a broken heart, "First Love" was voted in the top 10. "First Love" was performed during Utada's 2010 tour, Utada: In the Flesh 2010. It was also performed during Utada's two-date concert series Wild Life in December 2010. The song and "Hatsukoi" from her 2018 studio album of the same name inspired the 2022 Netflix series First Love. In December 9, 2022, "First Love" was remixed alongside "Hatsukoi" in Dolby Atmos.

Promotion
The song was used as the theme song for the Japanese drama Majo no Jōken, starring Hideaki Takizawa and Nanako Matsushima. "First Love" is featured in the PlayStation 2 rhythm game Unison, released in 2001.

Track listing

Personnel
 Hironori Akiyama – guitar
 Yuichiro Goto – strings
 Takahiro Iida – synthesizer programming
 Kei Kawano – arrangement, string arrangement, keyboards, programming
 Masayuki Momo – synthesizer programming
 Hikaru Utada – lyrics, music, vocals
 Goh Hotoda - mixing engineer

Charts

Certifications and sales

Release history

Juju version

"First Love" was covered by the Japanese R&B singer Juju in 2010, on her cover album Request. It was the main promotional single, and was released as a digital download to cellphones on September 15, 2010. Juju performed the song at Hey! Hey! Hey! on September 20.

Charts

Release history

Other cover versions
Naoko Terai (1999, violin, album Pure Moment)
Jessa Zaragoza (2000, on the album Siya Ba Ang Dahilan?)
Cao Xue Jing (2004, erhu solo, on the album Koiuta Erhu)
Toni Gonzaga (2006, on the album You Complete Me). Sampled the song for "We Belong"
Sotte Bosse (2007, on the album Innocent View)
Scott Murphy (Allister) (2008, on the album Guilty Pleasures 3)
Ryō Nagano (Apogee) (2008, digital single)
Yasushi Nakanishi (2008, on the album Standards 3)
Jake Shimabukuro (2008, ukulele solo, DVD Ichigo Ichie)
Makoto Hirahara (2009, saxophone, on the album Vocalese)
Sing-O (2009, digital single)
Starving Trancer feat. Maki (2009, on the album Exit Trance Presents Dramatic Trance Memorial Daiichiwa)
Hideaki Tokunaga (2010, on the album Vocalist 4)
Eric Martin (2010, on the album Mr. Vocalist 3)
Boyz II Men (2010 on the album Covered: Winter)
Repablikan (2013, covered, sung in Tagalog, 2022 on the album 2011 Jejemon)
May J. (2013, on the album Summer Ballad Covers)
Zivilia (2017, single, sung in Indonesian)
Kim Chae-won of LE SSERAFIM (2022, released on SoundCloud)

References

1999 singles
Hikaru Utada songs
Songs written by Hikaru Utada
Contemporary R&B ballads
Japanese television drama theme songs
1999 songs
Songs about heartache
1990s ballads